Jik may refer to:
 Jik-e Sofla or Jīk, a village in South Khorasan Province, Iran
 Ikaria Island National Airport, an airport in Greece serving the island of Icaria with the IATA code “JIK.”
 A Reckitt Benckiser bleach brand
 Kanye West's 9th studio album, Jesus is King
Jik is also a word in the Bulgarian language which can be used in every sentence as a substitute of every word in the sentence as long as the person you're talking to understands the meaning.
Example:
(Watching TV) 
Can you pass me the jik(pointing at the remote)

See also